"Broke in a Minute" is a song by Canadian rapper Tory Lanez, released on February 7, 2020 as the lead single from his mixtape The New Toronto 3 (2020). The song was produced by Papi Yerr.

Background and composition
Sajae Elder of The Fader described the track as "bass-heavy". Lyrically, the song is about Tory Lanez becoming rich; he also sings about how he used to work at Denny's and name-drops many brand names. In an Instagram post promoting the song's music video, Lanez revealed that "Broke in a Minute" was originally a freestyle to "Shotta Flow" by NLE Choppa.

Music video
An accompanying music video was released alongside the single. It features Tory Lanez showing his luxurious products and money, and dancing.

Charts

Certifications

References

2020 singles
2020 songs
Interscope Records singles
Tory Lanez songs
Songs written by Tory Lanez